Emelie Nykvist (née Westberg, born 6 April 1990) is a Swedish handball player, who last played for Nykøbing Falster Håndboldklub.
 
She played in the Swedish U-20 national team in 2010 and scored 11 goals in the tournament. She was raised in Skuru IK. There she played with her twin sister Johanna Westberg and Nathalie Hagman. She changed club from Skuru IK to Lugi HF 2014. After that year, Emelie became a professional in Denmark and Nykøbing Falster Handball Club. Here she was reunited with her sister Johanna Westberg and Nathalie Hagman 2016–2017 and together they won gold in the Danish championship that season.  After five years in Nykøbing Falster Handball Club, she left the club in 2020 after giving birth to her first child.

Her twin sister is Johanna Westberg.

References
Emelie Westberg - Eurohandball

Living people
1990 births
People from Nacka Municipality
Swedish female handball players
Twin sportspeople
Swedish twins
Sportspeople from Stockholm County